{{DISPLAYTITLE:C21H27NO}}
The molecular formula C21H27NO (molar mass: 309.44 g/mol) may refer to:

 Benproperine
 Dextromethadone
 Diphenidol
 Isomethadone
 Levomethadone
 Methadone

Molecular formulas